The 2022 Dumfries and Galloway Council election took place on 5 May 2022 to elect members of Dumfries and Galloway Council representing the Local Authority area of Dumfries and Galloway. It resulted in a council composition with no party receiving a majority of seats. The election used the twelve wards created as a result of the Local Governance (Scotland) Act 2004, with each ward electing three or four councillors using the single transferable vote system form of proportional representation, with 43 councillors being elected. 

Many prominent elected members stood down at this election, including the Leader of the Council, and former Dumfriesshire MSP, Elaine Murray.

Results 

Note: "Votes" are the first preference votes. The net gain/loss and percentage changes relate to the result of the previous Scottish local elections on 3 May 2007. This may differ from other published sources showing gain/loss relative to seats held at dissolution of Scotland's councils.

Ward results

Stranraer and the Rhins

Mid Galloway and Wigtown West

Dee and Glenkens

Castle Douglas and Crocketford

Abbey

North West Dumfries

Mid and Upper Nithsdale

Lochar

Nith

Annandale South

Annandale North

Annandale East and Eskdale

Aftermath
Over the 2017-2022 term, the SNP and Labour ran a coalition, while the Conservatives were the largest party. Following this election, the SNP under Cllr Stephen Thompson, Labour under Cllr Linda Dorward and the Independent Group (including 6 Independents and 1 Liberal Democrat) under Cllr Richard Brodie agreed to work together and form a "Rainbow Coalition". Thompson and Dorward became co-leaders of the council.

Despite the collaboration between the SNP and Labour, Scottish Labour leader Anas Sarwar claimed that the deal was an interim arrangement and "not for the duration of the entire council term". Ultimately, the coalition agreement lasted only 8 months and the Conservatives (with Independent support) took control of the administration.

Changes since 2022

Mid Galloway and Wigtown West by-election 
In October 2022, Labour councillor Sandy Whitelaw resigned, triggering a by-election in Ward 2 - Mid Galloway and Wigtown West, which was held on 8 December 2022.

Change in Council Leadership 
In February 2023, Labour councillors agreed to terminate their formal coalition with the SNP and Independent Councillors. The resulting agreement led to Councillor Stephen Thompson (SNP) being declared Leader of Dumfries & Galloway Council and Councillor Richard Brodie (Lib Dem) declared as Deputy Leader.

In March 2023, Labour abstentions and Independent Councillors' support allowed a Conservative budget to pass. As a result, the SNP leadership resigned, including Councillor Thompson. One week later, the Conservatives (with Independent Group support) elected Gail MacGregor as Council Leader, resulting in Dumfries & Galloway Council coming under Conservative administration.

References

Dumfries and Galloway
Dumfries and Galloway Council elections